Gaia Sanesi (born 1 April 1992) is an Italian former tennis player.

She has career-high WTA rankings of 294 in singles, achieved on 14 July 2014, and 388 in doubles, reached on 14 September 2015. Sanesi won five singles titles and ten doubles titles on the ITF Women's Circuit.

She made her WTA Tour main-draw debut at the 2015 Rio Open in the doubles tournament, partnering Estrella Cabeza Candela.

ITF Circuit finals

Singles: 13 (5–8)

Doubles: 20 (10–10)

External links
 
 

1992 births
Living people
Italian female tennis players
Sportspeople from Florence
21st-century Italian women